Pleurotaenium is a genus of green algae, specifically of the desmids (Desmidiaceae).

Morphology
Long, cylindrical, bilaterally symmetrical unicells with blunt ends.  Ring-like thickening in the central area where the two semicells join.  In a good specimen, very delightful to look at due to obvious intracellular activity, especially at the ends.

Reproduction
Asexual: cells arise from the partitioned parent cell

Sexual: Conjugation (transmission of DNA through nucleus fusion to form a hypnozygote or zygospore, which is a term for a zygote that lies dormant until optimal conditions arise)

References

External links

Scientific references

Scientific databases

 
 AlgaTerra database
 Index Nominum Genericorum

Desmidiaceae
Charophyta genera